Lucas "Luke" Cage, born Carl Lucas and also known as Power Man, is a character appearing in American comic books published by Marvel Comics. Created by Archie Goodwin, George Tuska, Roy Thomas, and John Romita Sr., the character first appeared in Luke Cage, Hero for Hire #1 (June 1972). He is one of the earliest black superheroes to be featured as the protagonist and title character of a Marvel comic book.

Created during the height of the blaxploitation genre, Luke Cage had been imprisoned for a crime he did not commit and gained the powers of superhuman strength and unbreakable skin after being subjected voluntarily to an experimental procedure. Once freed, he becomes a "hero for hire" and has forty-nine issues of solo adventures (comic title renamed to Luke Cage, Power Man with issue #17). In issue #50, Cage teams up with fellow superhero Iron Fist as part of a crime-fighting duo in the renamed title Power Man and Iron Fist. He later marries the super-powered private investigator Jessica Jones, with whom he has a daughter. In 2005, writer Brian Michael Bendis added Luke Cage to the lineup of the New Avengers, and he has since appeared in various Avengers titles, becoming leader of a group of reformed supervillains called the Thunderbolts, and eventually becoming the Mayor of New York City at the conclusion of the 2021–2022 crossover event "Devil's Reign", succeeding the Kingpin.

The character has been substantially adapted from the comics into various forms of media. In the Marvel Cinematic Universe (MCU), Mike Colter portrayed the character in the Netflix television series Jessica Jones (2015–2019), Luke Cage (2016–2018), and The Defenders (2017).

Development
Roy Thomas publicly discussed the characters creation, "In 1971, when the success of the movie Shaft had reached an interracial audience, Stan Lee decided it was time to go beyond Black Panther and Captain America's partner the Falcon as a support character.  I think he briefly toyed with the notion of a Falcon comic book, but probably felt the Falcon was better off where he was, and that he was perhaps not as strong a character as was needed.  When he mentioned that he wanted to work up a new African-American super-hero who would be a bit different and would start right out in his own comic, he asked me for my suggestions as to the writer.  I didn't feel I should do the character myself, so I suggested Archie Goodwin, although Gerry Conway, Len Wein, and others must've crossed my (and Stan's) mind.  Archie, Stan, and I--with John Romita perhaps present, spent a half hour or so in deliberations within the next day or so, and each of us contributed something to the mix.  Stan's was definitely the guiding hand, because he knew he wanted a super-hero who was off the beaten track, off to make a living at crime-fighting (a la a private eye), and with a different look or feel than a typical super-hero, even a Marvel one.  Romita helped provide that, of course, with the outfit that was perfectly suited to the 1970s, including the chains.  Stan was looking for a name for the character, and I suggested Cage, which later I realized I'd seen some time before on a list of potential character names Gil Kane had shown me and had consciously forgotten about. Archie would add the "Luke" when he did the script later.  Stan wanted an untypical name for the mag, too... not a usual super-hero name, but something indicating what he was.  I'd recently written an Avengers issue titled "Heroes for Hire," so I suggested HERO FOR HIRE as the title.  As for powers, I suggested he be very strong and bulletproof, though bullets could cause him some discomfort by raising temporary welts on his skin, etc.... Philip Wylie's Gladiator was my main inspiration here, though Stan and I agreed that we didn't want him to have Hugo Danner's leaping abilities (which had been borrowed by Superman years before).  Archie, I believe, came up with the precise escaped-innocent-prisoner concept, though Stan probably contributed to that as well.  And out of that committee of three (four, counting John's concept sketch) was Luke Cage, Hero for Hire born."

Romita commented on the design of the character stating "We did it together. The chains were because we wanted the slavery angle. His costume was supposed to say super-hero, yet not super-hero. It was whatever he salvaged when he escaped from prison. He had the yellow shirt and headband and wristbands to contrast with his black skin."

Publication history

Luke Cage was created following conversations between Archie Goodwin and Roy Thomas shortly after blaxploitation films emerged as a popular new genre. He debuted in his own series, with the cover trademark Luke Cage, Hero for Hire and the title Hero for Hire. The series initially was written by Goodwin and pencilled by George Tuska, with the character's costume designed by John Romita Sr. The character was the first Black American superhero to star in his own comic-book series, which was retitled with the cover trademark Luke Cage, Power Man and the trademarked title Power Man with issue #17. Cage's adventures were set in a grungier, more crime-dominated New York City than that inhabited by other Marvel superheroes of the time.

As blaxploitation's popularity faded, Cage was paired with the superhero Iron Fist, whose popularity was based on the declining martial arts film genre, in an effort to save both characters from cancellation. The series' title remained Power Man, though with issue #50 (April 1978) the trademarked cover title became Power Man and Iron Fist, retained through the series' cancellation with issue #125 (September 1986). The series' final writer, James Owsley (a.k.a. Christopher Priest), attempted to shed Cage's blaxploitation roots by giving him a larger vocabulary and reducing usage of his catchphrase, "Sweet Christmas!"

In 1992, Cage was relaunched in a new series simply titled Cage, set primarily in Chicago. The revived series updated the character, with Cage symbolically destroying his original costume on the cover of the first issue. The series, written by Marc McLaurin, ran 20 issues. Cage received exposure in other books at the time, including his own serial in the anthology series Marvel Comics Presents. In the aftermath of the "Onslaught" and "Heroes Reborn" companywide storylines, Cage was included in the series Heroes for Hire, written by John Ostrander, which lasted 19 issues. In 2002, writer Brian Azzarello and artist Richard Corben collaborated on Cage, a standalone mini-series set outside the mainstream Marvel canon. The mini-series was published under the Marvel MAX imprint, which allowed for a much greater degree of violence, sexual content and profanity.

Subsequently, Cage was featured in the Brian Michael Bendis-written series Alias, Secret War, The Pulse, Daredevil, and The New Avengers.

In 2010, Cage became a regular character in Thunderbolts, starting with issue #144, and continued as leader of the team when the title transitioned into Dark Avengers beginning with issue #175. Cage also reappeared as a regular character in the second volume of The New Avengers series.

In 2007, it was announced that cartoonist and Samurai Jack creator Genndy Tartakovsky would write and illustrate a four-issue limited series called Cage!, which would take place in a retro 1970s setting outside of the established continuity. The project was heavily delayed, but finally saw publication in 2016.

In 2016, a new volume of Power Man and Iron Fist was launched, written by David F. Walker. The series ran for 15 issues before transitioning into a new Luke Cage series (also written by Walker), which ran for another 10 issues.

Fictional character biography

Origin
Born Carl Lucas and raised in New York City's Harlem neighborhood, he spends his youth in a gang called the Rivals. With his friend Willis Stryker, he fights rival gangs and commits petty crimes. In and out of juvenile homes throughout his teens, Lucas dreams of becoming a major New York racketeer until he finally realizes how his actions are hurting his family. He seeks to better himself as an adult by finding legitimate employment. Meanwhile, Stryker rises through the ranks of crime, but the two men remain friends. When Stryker's activities anger the Maggia crime syndicate, he is badly beaten in a mob hit, saved only by Lucas's intervention. When Stryker's girlfriend, Reva Connors, breaks up with him in fear of his violent work, she seeks solace with Lucas. Stryker is convinced that Lucas is responsible for the breakup, so he plants heroin in Lucas's apartment and tips off the police. Lucas is arrested and sent to prison where contact with his family is sparse due to the resentment of his brother James Lucas Jr., who intercepts Lucas's letters to their father James and eventually leads each to believe the other is dead. During this time, Reva is killed by members of the Maggia, whose drugs Stryker had stolen to frame Lucas in the first place.

Lucas is consumed by rage over Stryker's betrayal and his father's supposed death, engaging in frequent brawls and escape attempts. Eventually transferred to Seagate Prison off the coast of Georgia, he becomes the favorite target of racist corrections officer Albert "Billy Bob" Rackham, whose sadistic brutality ultimately leads to a demotion that he blames on Lucas. Research scientist Dr. Noah Burstein recruits Lucas as a volunteer for a cellular regeneration experiment based on a variant of the Super-Soldier process he had previously used to empower Warhawk. This experiment would later be revealed to be part of the Weapon Plus program, specifically, Weapon VI. Burstein immerses Lucas in an electrical field conducted by an organic chemical compound; then he leaves Lucas unattended, Rackham alters the experiment's controls, hoping to maim or kill Lucas. Lucas' treatment is accelerated past its intended limits, inducing body-wide enhancements that give him superhuman strength and durability. He uses his new power to escape Seagate and makes his way back to New York, where a chance encounter with criminals inspires him to use his new powers for profit.

Adopting the alias Luke Cage and donning a distinctive costume, he launches a career as a Hero for Hire, helping anyone who can meet his price. He soon establishes an office above Times Square's Gem Theater, where he befriends film student D. W. Griffith. Burstein, aware of his friend's innocence, also relocates to New York and opens a medical clinic, assisted by Dr. Claire Temple, whom Cage begins dating. Although Cage is content to battle strictly conventional criminals, he soon learns that New York is hardly the place to do so. Stryker himself has become a Maggia agent known as Diamondback and dies battling Cage.

Superhero ties
Although Cage has little in common with most of New York's other superhumans, an ill-conceived attempt to collect a fee from a reneging Doctor Doom leads him to befriend the Fantastic Four. Via a later retcon, Cage also befriends Jessica Jones, a young woman whose superhuman strength and unconventional style match his own. During a mission in which Cage and Iron Man track down Orville Smythe, who had duped him into stealing an experimental starsuit from Stark International, Cage follows the example of his new peers and takes the codename of Power Man. Cage battles a rogue Erik Josten for the use of the Power Man name, winning the right.

Shortly afterward, Luke Cage begins associating with the loose-knit super-team the Defenders, alongside whom he battles the Wrecking Crew and the Sons of the Serpent. Called to assist the Defenders against the Plantman, Cage begins to complain that his participation in their group is interfering with his paying work. Wealthy Defenders member Nighthawk solves this problem by placing Power Man on retainer, giving Luke a steady paycheck for his Defenders activities. For some time thereafter, Power Man serves as a core member of the Defenders. Together, they defeat minor threats including the Eel and the Porcupine, and major menaces such as the Headmen, Nebulon, Egghead's Emissaries of Evil, and the Red Rajah; but Cage feels out of place in the often-bizarre exploits of the Defenders and eventually resigns.

Power Man and Iron Fist

Having obtained proof of Cage's innocence in his original drug charges, the criminal Bushmaster abducts Burstein and Temple, using their safety and the hope of acquittal to blackmail Cage into abducting detective Misty Knight, who humiliated Bushmaster in an earlier encounter. Cage's efforts lead to a fight with Knight's boyfriend, the martial artist Iron Fist, who had spent most of his life in the extra-dimensional city of K'un-L'un and was unfamiliar with Earth society. Upon learning of Cage's situation, Iron Fist and Knight help him defeat Bushmaster and rescue his friends. Cleared of criminal charges, Power Man legally changes his name to "Lucas Cage". He briefly works for Misty Knight and Colleen Wing's detective agency, Nightwing Restorations, but soon elects to join Iron Fist in a two-man team, Heroes for Hire, founded by attorney Jeryn Hogarth and staffed by administrative wunderkind Jennie Royce. Although the streetwise Power Man and the unworldly Iron Fist seem to have little in common, they soon become the best of friends. Cage's relationship with Claire Temple proves less durable, and he instead begins dating model Harmony Young.

Power Man and Iron Fist achieve great success with Heroes for Hire, earning an international reputation and fighting a wide variety of criminals. Their partnership's downfall begins when the mysterious government agency S.M.I.L.E. manipulates Power Man and Iron Fist into the employment of Consolidated Conglomerates, Inc., which eventually frames Cage for the apparent murder of Iron Fist, causing Cage to become a fugitive.

Chicago
A fugitive again, Cage breaks contact with his New York friends and relocates to Chicago, but, with Hogarth's help, he is cleared of criminal charges when Iron Fist turns up alive. Cage discovers that Iron Fist had been replaced by a doppelganger of the plantlike H'ylthri race, K'un-Lun's ancient enemies during his treatment. This doppelganger's existence and destruction at the hands of the Super-Skrull are part of a bizarre scheme engineered by Iron Fist's enemy, Master Khan.

Wanting a new start after his murder charge is dropped, Cage abandons his Power Man guise and begins operating out of Chicago as the plainclothes Luke Cage, Hero for Hire; he makes arrangements with the Chicago Spectator for exclusive reports of his adventures and frequently works with detective Dakota North. On his first mission in Chicago, he assists the Punisher in battling drug dealers. Cage attracts the interest of the refined assassin Hardcore, an employee of Cruz Bushmaster, son of the villain whose defeat cleared Cage's name the first time. Cage learns that Cruz, following in his father's extortion footsteps, has abducted Noah Burstein's wife Emma to force the scientist to recreate the process that had empowered Cage. Cruz undergoes the procedure himself, but the elder Bushmaster drains the power from his son, reversing his near-catatonia and declaring himself the Power Master. Cage teams with Iron Fist to thwart their plans, freeing the Bursteins while the Bushmasters apparently perish. Cage's power is augmented further by exposure to the Power Man virus.

While Cage tries to locate his surviving family members with the aid of Dakota North, his brother keeps moving his father around to keep Cage away from them. James Lucas Jr., is eventually recruited by the criminal Corporation, whose power-enhancing scientist Dr. Karl Malus mutates him into the superhuman Coldfire. As Coldfire, James Jr. hopes to be a match for his brother, whom he regards as a threat. Though James, Jr. works with the Corporation quite willingly, Malus has James Sr. held hostage as extra insurance of Coldfire's cooperation. When Cage learns the Corporation is holding his family, he invades their headquarters and battles Coldfire. The brothers ultimately join forces to rescue their father from Malus, and Coldfire sacrifices himself to destroy the Corporation's headquarters.

Heroes for Hire return
A few months later, Cage investigates the murder of Harmony Young and fights her killer, the demon Darklove, alongside Ghost Rider. The mystic Doctor Druid recruits Cage to serve in his Secret Defenders against the sorcerer Malachi. Cage returns to New York and, deciding his heart is no longer in superheroics, becomes co-owner of the Gem Theater with his friend D.W. Griffith. Even an invitation from Iron Fist to join a new and expanded Heroes for Hire fails to interest him; yet when the Master of the World tries to recruit Cage as a spy within Iron Fist's team, destroying Cage's theater in the process, a curious Cage plays along. Cage joins Heroes for Hire and serves with them for some time while reporting to the Master. Cage begins to sympathize with the more benevolent aspects of the Master's goals, but in the end, Cage can neither betray Iron Fist nor reconcile himself to the tremendous loss of life the Master's plans of conquest will entail, and he helps Heroes for Hire destroy the Master of the World's plans. Cage remains with the group thereafter, and dates a fellow member, the She-Hulk. When the Stark-Fujikawa Corporation buys out Heroes for Hire, Cage and Ant-Man are fired because of their prison records, and the rest of the team quits in protest.

Cage, bitten by the hero bug once more, continues to share adventures with Iron Fist and other heroes. Briefly resuming his Power Man identity, he is hired by Moon Knight to join an unnamed team of street-level New York vigilantes, but mere days after he joins, the group dissolves following clashes with the forces of Tombstone and Fu Manchu. Deciding that a return to basics is in order, he re-establishes his Hero for Hire activities and soon learns that, despite his international fame, he is almost forgotten on the streets where he originally made his reputation. He invests his money in a bar and sets about ridding his immediate neighborhood of criminal elements, deciding that the business of world-saving is best left to others.

Jessica Jones and the New Avengers
After a sexual encounter with a drunken Jessica Jones, now a private investigator, Cage's life is briefly thrown into disarray by Jones's reaction to the incident. The two make peace while working as bodyguards for Matt Murdock. Cage extends emotional support to Jones when she is forced to revisit past abuses by the villainous Purple Man, and Cage's feelings for her grow. After Jones reveals that she is pregnant from their tryst, she and Cage move in together. Soon afterward, Jones becomes a superhuman consultant with the Daily Bugle. After she is attacked by the Green Goblin during a Bugle investigation, Cage, helped by Spider-Man, deliberately attacks Norman Osborn to provoke him into revealing he is the Goblin.

Months afterwards, Cage is present at the breakout at the supervillain prison 'The Raft' and becomes a founding member of the re-formed Avengers. Luke and Jessica Jones then have a daughter, whom they named Danielle, in honor of Danny Rand. Soon thereafter, he and Jessica are married. He also meets the Black Panther (revealed to be one of Luke's personal heroes), joining him and several other superhumans of African descent on a mission against vampires in New Orleans.

When the Superhuman Registration Act is enacted, Cage refuses to register, comparing the act to Jim Crow laws. He and Jessica agree that she will take their newborn daughter away to Canada where they can be safe, though he himself refuses to leave. S.H.I.E.L.D. forces come to arrest Cage, but he fights his way to safety with the help of Captain America, the Falcon, and Iron Fist (posing as Daredevil), and joins Captain America's "Secret Avengers". He fights alongside them in opposition to the act until Captain America surrenders to U.S. authorities.

Cage does not comply with the amnesty offered to the Secret Avengers, going underground and re-forming the New Avengers. Luke assumes leadership of the New Avengers after the assassination of Captain America, with the team now operating underground and provided with secure accommodation by Doctor Strange.

Following a Skrull invasion, Captain America (James "Bucky" Barnes) organizes a meeting with the New Avengers at his home, offering it as a base of operations. Cage is offered the role as leader of the New Avengers, but turns it down, giving the role to Ronin.

Thunderbolts
Following the Siege of Asgard, Steve Rogers appoints Luke Cage leader of the Thunderbolts program. Soon after, he begins to recruit new Thunderbolts, a balanced mix of former and older members, personally inducting the Ghost, Moonstone, the Juggernaut and Crossbones, with MACH-V, Fixer and Songbird's cooperation, and using the Man-Thing's powers for long-distance transportation.

Reforming the Avengers
To convince Cage to rejoin the Avengers, Steve Rogers and Tony Stark sell the newly renovated mansion to Luke Cage for a dollar, allowing him freedom to recruit his own Avengers team and operate without directly taking orders from Rogers, though Rogers insists on having Victoria Hand join them as a liaison. Cage and his team are forced to assist Doctor Strange, Daimon Hellstrom, and Brother Voodoo in thwarting an attempt by Agamotto—the original owner of the Eye of Agamotto—to destroy existence, culminating in the apparent death of Brother Voodoo. Although initially against the idea of being paid for being on the team, Cage is convinced to accept the offer.

Following his imprisonment on Utopia, he decides, following a conversation with Daredevil, to resign from his Avenger duties to ensure the security of his wife and child. After the X-Men are defeated, Cage, Jessica, Squirrel Girl, and Iron Fist resign from the Avengers. In volume 2 of The Mighty Avengers, Luke Cage wears a costume reminiscent of his yellow Bronze Age outfit, with a yellow top and blue jeans.

Marvel NOW!
During the series The Superior Spider-Man, Cage assembles an incarnation of the Mighty Avengers, and officially declares the new assembled group to be Avengers.

All-New, All-Different Marvel
As part of the "All-New, All-Different Marvel", Luke Cage and Iron Fist take on the murder case of their former secretary, Jennifer "White Jennie" Royce, and discover she has been corrupted by an ancient African artifact called the Super Soulstone.

During the "Civil War II" storyline, Luke Cage hears about the talents of Ulysses Cain and the fight over him. After thinking this through, Luke tells Iron Fist that he is sitting this fight out.

During the "Secret Empire" storyline, Luke Cage became a member of the Defenders alongside Daredevil, Iron Fist, and Jessica Jones. They alongside Cloak and Dagger, Doctor Strange, and Spider-Woman fought the Army of Evil during Hydra's rise to power where they were defeated by Nitro. Luke Cage and those with him were trapped in the Darkforce dome by Blackout when his powers were enhanced by Baron Helmut Zemo using the Darkhold.

During the "Hunt for Wolverine" storyline, Luke Cage and Jessica Jones assist Iron Man and Spider-Man in finding Wolverine when his body has gone missing from his unmarked grave. When the four of them arrive undercover at a submarine in international waters upon hearing that a genetic material will be auctioned off, Luke and Jessica are shocked to find that the genetic material that will be auctioned off belongs to their daughter Danielle. When Mister Sinister crashes the auction and attacks the unidentified seller claiming that he stole the DNA of Wolverine from him, the attack causes a hole in the submarine as Jessica Jones uses Luke Cage's body to help plug it up. After Mister Sinister is defeated with the help of X-23 and the seller Declan Foy is questioned, Luke Cage is given a special Iron Man armor as part of their attack on Mister Sinister's base on the Kerguelen Islands. After the database was destroyed and the mission was over, Luke and Jessica head home with Tony Stark, Peter Parker, and X-23 where Iron Fist had been babysitting Danielle Cage. After a talk with X-23, Tony informs Luke and Jessica that the destroyed database reveals that one of the X-Men members is not a mutant and there is a genetically-altered sleeper agent among them.

Fresh Start
During the "Empyre" storyline, Vision and Doctor Nemesis meet up with Luke Cage as they investigate the Cotati's plants that have taken over Central Park. As Vision brings the fight with his plant-like opponent outside of Central Park, Luke Cage and Doctor Nemesis mistake it for a Cotati only for Vision to correct them by stating that his opponent is actually Plantman. Doctor Nemesis, Luke Cage, and Vision continue their fight with Plantman and his Sprout Soldiers. They managed to defeat Plantman, but are unable to make contact with Black Panther.

When Fisk attempts to start a new campaign against superhumans, the heroes decide to oppose this plan by having Luke Cage run for mayor against him (Tony Stark initially volunteered, but others noted that this would basically involve two white men competing for a position of power, and they wanted to establish themselves as different from Fisk, and the "Tony" who volunteered was later revealed to be the Chameleon in disguise). After Fisk was forced to flee the city, Cage won the election by default, but is forced to maintain the anti-vigilante laws as he lacks the authority to have them dismantled right away. His first step to control these laws is to appoint Clint Barton the leader of a new branch of the Thunderbolts, which Fisk had restarted as an anti-vigilante taskforce.

Consequentially, at the end of the "Devil's Reign" storyline, Luke Cage is elected Mayor of New York.

Powers and abilities
Luke Cage possesses superhuman strength and stamina, and has extremely dense skin and muscle tissue which render him highly resistant to physical injury. Cage possesses these abilities as a result of a cellular regeneration experiment which fortified the various tissues of his body. His skin can resist large-caliber bullets, puncture wounds, corrosives, biological attacks, and extreme temperatures and pressures without sustaining damage. A second exposure to said experiments further enhanced his strength and durability.

The same experiment which granted him his great strength and durability has also given him a faster-than-normal recovery time from injury.

Luke Cage is an exceptional street fighter and was a gifted athlete before receiving superhuman abilities. He has also studied martial arts under Iron Fist's instruction, learning how to couple leverage with his strength to increase his combat effectiveness against more powerful opponents.

He owns a jacket that is as durable as his skin, having been exposed to the "Power Man" treatment during his second exposure.

Supporting characters

Reception

Analysis 
Sharon Packer of Priory Group made connections between Cage's origin story and historical events taking place in the time of the comics' publication. Carl Lucas uses his newfound power to crash through the prison's cement barricades, he symbolically breaks through barriers that were once closed to him, similar to other black people of his era. Luke Cage's story has a distinct connection to unethical medical experiments; his comics presumably enhanced awareness of the Tuskegee syphilis experiments that made New York Times headlines in the very same month and year that Luke Cage debuted. Dr. Altman published a book on self-experimentation ethics, one of many texts discussing ethical breaches in medical experiments at that time, meaning that the Luke Cage stories likely picked up on the rhetoric on prison experiments during that time and tapped into opprobrium about ethics. Since his comics were released at the same time that the news broke about the Tuskegee syphilis experiments on black men in Alabama, an event which caused public outrage and swayed public opinion against non-consenting or coercive human experimentation, it can be inferred that Luke Cage's story influenced some of the aforementioned public opinion.

Accolades 

 In 2008, Wizard Magazine ranked Luke Cage 34th in their "Top 200 Comic Book Characters" list. 
 In 2011, IGN ranked Luke Cage 72nd in their "Top 100 Comic Book Heroes" list.
 In 2012, IGN ranked Luke Cage 72nd in their "Top 50 Avengers" list.
 in 2015, Gizmodo ranked Luke Cage 23rd in their "Every Member Of The Avengers" list.
 In 2015, Entertainment Weekly ranked Luke Cage 11th in their "Let's rank every Avenger ever" list.
 In 2019, Comicbook.com ranked Luke Cage 45th in their "50 Most Important Superheroes Ever" list.
 In 2022, Screen Rant included Luke Cage in their "10 Most Powerful Avengers In Marvel Comics" list.
 In 2022, CBR.com ranked Luke Cage 2nd in their "10 Coolest Avengers" list, 2nd in their "Thunderbolts' 10 Best Leaders" list and 10th in their "10 Best Mercenaries In Marvel Comics" list.

Other versions

Earth X
In the alternate future of Earth X, most of humanity has gained superpowers, but is still in need of policing. An older Luke Cage is a police officer, complete with uniform, and he recruits Peter Parker.

Exiles
In an alternate reality depicted in the one-shot Exiles: Days of Then and Now, Luke Cage is Power Fist, a mix between the 616 versions of Luke Cage/Power Man and his friend Iron Fist. He is also this reality's leader of the Avengers. He leads them to eradicate the Vi-Locks and his life is saved by Sunfire when she is stuck on his world. He later moves to Quentin Quire's reality to replace one of his selves who had died when he shouldn't have.

"Heroes Reborn"
In an alternate reality depicted in the 2021 "Heroes Reborn" miniseries, Luke Cage became the NYPD's police commissioner and an ally of Nighthawk.

"House of M"
A version of Luke Cage resides in the "House of M" reality. After gaining his powers, Luke forms a crime syndicate in Hell's Kitchen, which he later turns into a Human Resistance Movement and recruits several human heroes to his side, including Cloak, who looks up to Luke as a father figure. He is the first person to whom Layla Miller comes to 'awaken' from the House of M reality, and joins the force that takes down Magneto and his children in Genosha.

Marvel MAX
In the Marvel MAX Cage limited series, Cage's origin is much the same, with Luke and Willis Stryker growing up as hoodlums working for the deformed mobster Sonny "The Hammer" Caputo. When Willis double-crossed Luke and had him sent to prison, Luke retaliated by putting out a hit on his former friend. However, Caputo's men botched the hit, accidentally killing Reva Connors instead. While in prison, Cage voluntarily underwent an experimental procedure that gave him enhanced strength and durability. However, the procedure did not actually leave him bulletproof, as demonstrated when he was badly beaten and nearly killed by Mick "Mountain" Marko.

After being hired by the mother of a young girl who was killed by a stray bullet, Cage is drawn into a gang war among Caputo, Tombstone and Clifford "Clifto" Townsend. The mini-series ends on an uncertain note, with Cage standing between Caputo and Tombstone as both men fire their guns.

Marvel Noir
In the Marvel Noir universe, former criminal Luke Cage uses his bulletproof reputation to clean up his life and neighborhood after a stay in prison.

Marvel Zombies
In Marvel Zombies, Luke Cage is a member of the Avengers and one of the first heroes to become infected by the alien virus, ultimately infected by the zombified Sentry, along with the other Avengers. He also encounters Ash Williams not long after being infected. He is among the few heroes who manages to eat the Silver Surfer, and receives cosmic powers by doing so. At the end of the Marvel Zombies miniseries, he helps to devour Galactus and becomes a member of "The Galacti" (along with Iron Man, Spider-Man, Giant Man, Wolverine, and the Hulk), who travel across the universe devouring all life on planets, however Galactus's energy bolts hit the lower half of Cage's body. Next, the Marvel Zombies attack a Skrull planet, only to encounter the Fantastic Four—consisting of Black Panther, Storm, the Thing and the Human Torch. It pleases the zombies so much that they attempt to capture the Fantastic Four and try to transport back to their fully populated reality, but the FF manage to escape.

Luke Cage also has a role in Marvel Zombies 2, joining Spider-Man in fighting against the other Galactus as he realizes that their hunger has faded over time. His lost arm is replaced by a transplanted arm from an unknown being (possibly alien) and his lost lower half is also replaced with a cybernetic one. At the series conclusion, he is transported to another universe which also gets taken by the infection. Cage fights to defeat the hungry zombies of this reality, leading the converted Shi'ar against Earth, but is defeated and killed by the prime zombies of the new world.

"Secret Wars"
During the "Secret Wars" storyline, different versions of Luke Cage appear in the different Battleworld domains:

 In the Battleworld domain of Spider-Island, Luke Cage was part of the resistance's attack on Spider Queen.
 In the Battleworld domain of the Valley of Doom, Luke Cage helped Sheriff Red Wolf keep the peace in Timely following the death of Mayor Wilson Fisk.
 In the Battleworld domain of the Warzone, Luke Cage was still on Captain America's side as the superhuman civil war has intensified.
 In the Battleworld domain of Arcadia, Luke Cage and Jessica Jones assisted in fighting a horde of zombies from the Deadlands after the female Loki attacked part of the Shield.
 In the Battleworld domain of the Walled City of New York, Luke Cage and Jessica Jones are married and live in their residence in Harlem.

Ultimate Marvel
A different version of Power Man appears in the Ultimate Marvel universe as a member of the Defenders, although he is never referred to as "Luke Cage". In this universe, the Defenders consist of several people who want to be superheroes but have no superpowers, and appear to be more interested in the celebrity aspect of being heroes than actually doing anything heroic.

However, in Ultimate Comics: New Ultimates, he and the Defenders all appear with powers similar to their mainstream versions, given to them by Loki.

In other media

Television
 Luke Cage appears in The Super Hero Squad Show, voiced by Lil' JJ. This version is a member of the Heroes for Hire.
 Luke Cage appears in The Avengers: Earth's Mightiest Heroes, voiced by Christopher B. Duncan. This version is a member of the Heroes for Hire and founding member of the New Avengers.
 Luke Cage / Power Man appears in Ultimate Spider-Man, voiced by Ogie Banks. This version is a teenager and member of a S.H.I.E.L.D. team led by Spider-Man who received his powers as a result of his scientist parents, Walter and Amanda Cage's (voiced by Phil LaMarr and Kimberly Brooks respectively), attempts at recreating the Super Soldier Formula that empowered Captain America before the pair were kidnapped by Scorpio. In his most notable appearances, Luke temporarily moves in with Spider-Man's Aunt May along with the rest of their team, gets injured while fighting the Rhino, who manages to leave a gash in Luke's impenetrable skin, becomes a founding member of the New Warriors, and reunites with his parents while receiving Spider-Man's help in finding them and defeating Zodiac.
 Luke Cage appears in Marvel Disk Wars: The Avengers, voiced by Ryōkan Koyanagi in Japanese and Catero Colbert in English.
 Luke Cage appears in Marvel's Netflix television series, portrayed by Mike Colter.
 He first appears in Jessica Jones, in which it is revealed that he was previously in a relationship with a woman named Reva Connors before Kilgrave forced Jessica Jones to murder her.
 Cage also appears in a self-titled series and The Defenders, with the latter series seeing Cage and Jones become founding members of the eponymous team.

Film
 A film adaptation of Luke Cage had been in development since 2003 by Columbia Pictures, with a screenplay penned by Ben Ramsey, Avi Arad serving as producer, and John Singleton directing. Jamie Foxx and Tyrese Gibson were considered for the lead role, while Dwayne Johnson, Isaiah Mustafa, and Idris Elba expressed interest in playing Cage. In May 2013, it was announced that the film rights for Power Man had reverted to Marvel Studios.
 In November 2013, Disney CEO Bob Iger stated that if Marvel's Netflix TV series, such as Luke Cage, become popular, "It's quite possible that they could become feature films."

Video games
 Luke Cage appears as a playable character in Marvel: Ultimate Alliance, voiced by Greg Eagles. Additionally, his New Avengers, Heroes for Hire, civilian attire, and street outfits appear as alternate skins.
 Luke Cage appears as an assist character in Spider-Man: Web of Shadows, voiced by Robert Wisdom. Additionally, a symbiote-infected Cage appears as a boss in the Nintendo DS version of the game.
 Luke Cage appears as a playable character in Marvel: Ultimate Alliance 2, voiced by Khary Payton. This version supports Captain America in opposing the Superhuman Registration Act. Additionally, his Secret War stealth outfit appears as an unlockable alternate skin.
 Luke Cage appears in Iron Fist's ending for Ultimate Marvel vs. Capcom 3 as a member of his new Heroes for Hire and a card for the Heroes and Heralds mode. Additionally, his Power Fist counterpart from the New Exiles series appears as an alternate costume for Iron Fist.
 Luke Cage appeared as an unlockable playable character in Marvel Super Hero Squad Online.
 Luke Cage appeared as an unlockable playable character in Marvel Avengers Alliance. He is later transformed into one of the Serpent's Worthy, Nul, Breaker of Worlds.
 Luke Cage appeared as an unlockable playable character in Marvel Heroes, voiced by James C. Mathis III.
 Luke Cage / Power Man appears as an unlockable playable character in Lego Marvel Super Heroes, voiced by John Eric Bentley.
 Luke Cage appears as a NPC in Disney Infinity: Marvel Super Heroes, voiced again by Ogie Banks.
 Luke Cage appears in Disney Infinity 3.0.
 Luke Cage appears as an unlockable playable character in Lego Marvel's Avengers, voiced again by Ogie Banks.
 Luke Cage appears as an unlockable playable character in Marvel Future Fight.
 Luke Cage appears as an unlockable playable character in Marvel Contest of Champions.
 Luke Cage appears as an unlockable playable character in Marvel Avengers Academy.
 Luke Cage appears as an unlockable playable character in Lego Marvel Super Heroes 2.
 Luke Cage appears as an unlockable playable character in Marvel Strike Force. This version is a member of the Defenders.
 Two incarnations of Luke Cage, "Hero for Hire" and "Power Man", appear as unlockable playable characters in Marvel Puzzle Quest.
 Luke Cage appears as an unlockable playable character in Marvel Ultimate Alliance 3: The Black Order, voiced again by James C. Mathis III.

Miscellaneous 
 Luke Cage appears in the motion comic Spider-Woman: Agent of S.W.O.R.D, voiced by Jesse Falcon.
 Luke Cage appears in the motion comic Wolverine: Weapon X, voiced Trevor Devall.
 Luke Cage appears in the motion comic War of the Realms: Marvel Ultimate Comics, voiced by Deven Mack.
 Luke Cage appears as a playable character in Unmatched: Redemption Row, published by Restoration Games and featuring art by Matt Taylor.

Collected editions

See also
 List of African-American firsts

References

External links
 Luke Cage at Don Markstein's Toonopedia. Archived October 25, 2011

 
 

 
1972 comics debuts
African-American superheroes
Avengers (comics) characters
Characters created by Archie Goodwin (comics)
Characters created by John Romita Sr.
Characters created by George Tuska
Characters created by Roy Thomas
Comics characters introduced in 1972
Fictional characters from Manhattan
Fictional characters with superhuman durability or invulnerability
Fictional detectives
Fictional mercenaries in comics
Human experimentation in fiction
Marvel Comics characters with accelerated healing
Marvel Comics characters with superhuman strength
Marvel Comics male superheroes
Marvel Comics mutates
Marvel Comics superheroes
Vigilante characters in comics